Topanga may refer to:

Entertainment
 PUP (band), a Canadian band formerly known as Topanga
 Topanga (album), a 1994 album by Scottish-Australian singer Colin Hay
 "Topanga", a single by American rapper Trippie Redd on the 2018 mixtape A Love Letter to You 3
 "Topanga" (voice memo), a song by American singer Noah Cyrus on her 2018 EP Good Cry
 Topanga Lawrence, a character from the television series Boy Meets World and Girl Meets World

Places in the United States
 Topanga, California, an unincorporated area of Los Angeles County
 Westfield Topanga, a shopping mall in Canoga Park, California
 Topanga State Park in Los Angeles County, California

Other uses
 Topanga Canyon Boulevard, a common local name for California State Route 27